The 3rd Seiyu Awards ceremony was held on March 7, 2009 at the UDX Theater in Akihabara, Tokyo, and was broadcast on BS11 on May 3, 2009.  The period of general voting lasted from October 1, 2008 to January 1, 2009.

References

Seiyu Awards ceremonies
Seiyu
Seiyu
2009 in Japanese cinema
2009 in Japanese television